Caito is an Italian surname. Notable people with the surname include: 

 Nicolas Caito (born 1969), French patternmaker
 Tom Caito, American football coach

See also
 Cato (disambiguation)

Italian-language surnames